Arteza (possibly from Quechua for a wooden boat) is a mountain in the Cordillera Blanca in the Andes of Peru, about  high. It is situated in the Ancash Region, Huari Province, Huantar District. Arteza lies at the Qarwakancha valley, southeast of Andavite and Cayesh and northeast of Qarwakancha and Maparaju.

References

Mountains of Peru
Mountains of Ancash Region